Palestinian Canadians are Canadian citizens of Palestinian descent or Palestine-born people residing in Canada. According to the 2016 Census there were 74,820 Canadians who claimed Palestinian ancestry.

Notable Palestinian Canadians 
Nasri
 Ruba Nadda
 Belly
 Ty Wood
 Yasser Abbas
 Yasmine Mohammed

See also 

Arab Canadians
Middle Eastern Canadians
West Asian Canadians

References 

 
Arab Canadian
 
Canada
West Asian Canadians